Russia women's national goalball team is the women's national team of Russia. It takes part in international goalball competitions.  Goalball is a team sport designed specifically for athletes with a vision impairment.

Paralympic Games  

The team did not compete in the 2012 London Paralympic Games.

2016 Rio de Janeiro 

The team was to compete in the 2016 Summer Paralympics, from 7 to 18 September 2016, in Rio de Janeiro, Brazil.  

The team qualified for Rio 2016 after finishing second at the 2014 World Championships.  After the Russia nation was disqualified from participation in the Games, their spot was re-allocated to Australia.

2020 Tokyo 

On 17 December 2020 the Court of Arbitration for Sport (CAS) decision involving the World Anti-Doping Agency and Russia's participation determined those athletes not implicated in doping or covering up positive tests may still be allowed to compete, but not under the Russian Federation flag.  The Russia women's national goalball team, who secured a Tokyo 2020 Paralympic Games position through first place in the women's category of the 2018 World Championships, who may otherwise have competed as a 'neutral team' (EUN), will be known as the 'Russian Paralympic Committee' (RPC) at the Tokyo 2020 Paralympic Games.

Round-robin

World Championships

2010 Sheffield 

The team competed in the 2010 World Championships in Sheffield, England, from 20 to 25 June 2010.  They were in Pool Y with a total of six teams.  This was their first world championships.

2014 Espoo  

The team competed in the 2014 World Championships from 30 June to 5 July 2014, in Espoo, Finland.  They placed fourth in Pool X, and beat China in the quarter-finals, 4:1.  They progressed to the semi-finals, beating Turkey, 2:1, before losing to Turkey in the gold medal match, 0:3.

2018 Malmö 

The team competed in the 2018 World Championships from 3 to 8 June 2018, in Baltiska Hallen, Malmö, Sweden.  They placed first in Pool C with four wins and one draw, and first in overall final standings, after beating Turkey, 4:3.  This earned them a slot at the Tokyo 2020 Paralympic Games.

IBSA World Games

2011 Antalya  

The team competed in the 2011 IBSA World Games from 1 to 10 April 2011, in Antalya, Turkey, organised by the Turkish Blind Sports Federation.  They placed third in Group Y, and took the bronze medal.

2015 Seoul  

The team did not compete in the 2015 IBSA World Games from 10 to 17 May 2015, in Seoul, South Korea.

Regional championships 

The team competes in the IBSA Europe goalball region.  Groups A and C are held one year, and Group B the following year.  Strong teams move towards Group A.

2007 Antalya  

The team competed at the 2007 IBSA Goalball European Championships, hosted by the Turkish Blind Sports Federation, in Antalya, Turkey with 11 teams contesting the women's competition. The team finished last.  This was their debut, with a men's team having played at major international tournaments.

2009 Munich (Group A) 

Munich, Germany hosted the 2009 European Championships with eleven teams taking part.  The team finished the event in eighth place.

2013 Konya (Group A)  

The team competed at the 2013 IBSA Goalball European Championships, Group A, from 1 to 11 November 2013, at Konya, Turkey, where they finished first.

2015 Kaunas (Group A) 

The team competed in the 2015 IBSA Goalball European A Championships in Kaunas, Lithuania.  They lost the gold medal game to Turkey, 0:5.

2017 Pajulahti (Group A) 

The team competed in the 2017 IBSA Goalball European A Championships from 15 to 23 September 2017, at Pajulahti, Nastola, Finland.  First in Pool Y, in the gold medal match, they beat Turkey, 6:3.

2019 Rostock (Group A) 

The team competed in the 2019 IBSA Goalball European A Championships from 5 to 14 October 2019, in Rostock, Germany.  Playing in Pool X, they placed first in the pool, and fifth in the final standings.  

Athletes included: Irina Arestova (Krasnodar Territory), Elizaveta Kemesheva (Vologda Region), Natalya Makoveeva (Tula Region), Anastasiia Mazur (Moscow Region/Kaluga Region), Yuliya Mikhailova (Kaluga Region), and Anna Shevchenko (Vologda Region).  Their coach was Ilkam Nabiev.

Competitive history 

The table below contains individual game results for the team in international matches and competitions.

Goal scoring by competition

See also 

 Disabled sports 
 Russia at the Paralympics

References

Goalball women's
National women's goalball teams
Russia at the Paralympics
Goalball in Russia
European national goalball teams